Events from the year 1838 in Germany

Incumbents
 Kingdom of Prussia 
 Monarch – Frederick William III of Prussia (16 November 1797 – 7 June 1840)
 Kingdom of Bavaria
 Monarch - Ludwig I (1825–1848)
 Prime Minister – Karl von Abel (1837–1847)
 Kingdom of Saxony
 Frederick Augustus (1836–1854)
 Kingdom of Hanover– Ernest Augustus (1837–1851)
 Kingdom of Württemberg – William (1816–1864)

Events

Date unknown 
 Friedrich Bessel makes the first accurate measurement of distance to a star.

Births 

 January 6- Max Bruch, German composer (d. 1920)
 January 16 – Franz Brentano, German philosopher, psychologist (d. 1917)
 June 24 – Gustav von Schmoller, German economist (d. 1917)
 July 8 – Ferdinand von Zeppelin, German military officer, founder of the Zeppelin Company (d. 1917)

Deaths 

 February 24 – Christoph Johann von Medem, German courtier (b. 1763)
April 12 – Johann Adam Möhler, German theologian (born 1796)
 June 14 – Maximilian von Montgelas, Bavarian statesman (b. 1759)
 August 21 – Adelbert von Chamisso, German writer (b. 1781)
 November 9 – Friedrich Carl Gröger, north-German portrait painter and lithographer (born 1766)

References

Bibliography

Years of the 19th century in Germany
Germany
Germany